Our Lady of Fatima Hospital (more commonly Fatima Hospital) is a for-profit hospital in North Providence, Rhode Island, which opened in 1954. The hospital is sponsored by the Roman Catholic Diocese of Providence. The Diocese merged St. Joseph and Our Lady of Fatima Hospitals in the 1970s.

See also
List of hospitals in Rhode Island

References

External links

Hospital buildings completed in 1892
Organizations based in Providence, Rhode Island
Buildings and structures in Providence, Rhode Island
Hospitals in Rhode Island
Roman Catholic Diocese of Providence
1892 establishments in Rhode Island
Catholic hospitals in North America